The Secure Shell Protocol (SSH) is a network protocol for secure data communication and remote command execution.

SSH may also refer to:

Science and technology 
 Saffir–Simpson hurricane scale, classifies hurricanes – Western Hemisphere tropical cyclones – that exceed the intensities of tropical depressions and tropical storms – into five categories
 Sea-surface height, the topography of the ocean surface
 Social sciences and humanities, the disciplines and communities involved in or related to this area of research and science
 Suppression subtractive hybridization, a genetic technique to show differentially expressed genes
 Su–Schrieffer–Heeger model, a physical model for a simple model for a topological insulator

Organizations 
 SSH Communications Security, a Finnish company that developed the Secure Shell protocol
 Secondary State Highways, branches of Primary State Highways in Washington from 1937 to 1964
 IATA airport code SSH for Sharm El Sheikh International Airport, an international airport in Egypt
 Silver State Helicopters, a helicopter operator

Other uses 
 The ISO 639-3 code for Shihhi Arabic
 South Superhighway, a former official name of the South Luzon Expressway in the Philippines, now referring to the Manila-Makati segments of an expressway

See also

 
 
 
 
 shh (disambiguation)
 SH (disambiguation)